John Michael Anthony Koerner (September 29, 1913 – February 23, 2014) was a Czechoslovakian-born artist in British Columbia, Canada.

He was born in Moravia, the son of Theodor Koerner, part of a family involved in the lumber industry. Koerner was exposed to art at an early age in Paris and Italy. Although his ultimate goal was to become an artist, on his father's advice, he studied law at Charles University in Prague and at the Sorbonne. With the rise of the Third Reich in Germany, he left Prague with his father and uncles, settling in Paris. However, it became necessary for the family to leave again and, the following year, they arrived in Vancouver, British Columbia.

He worked in the family lumber business for twelve years before returning to his first love, art. He also taught at the Vancouver School of Art and the University of British Columbia. A number of his works were acquired by the National Gallery of Canada. He also became friends with painter Lawren Harris, who invited him to join the exhibition committee of the Vancouver Art Gallery. His work also appears in the collections of the Tate in London, of Clare Hall at Cambridge University and of the Hirshhorn Museum in Washington, DC.

His work was influenced by German philosopher Bo Yin Ra.

Following his 100th birthday, Koerner had a show at the Burnaby Art Gallery and the exhibition John Koerner: The Hidden Side of Nature at the Penticton Art Gallery. He died at home in Vancouver at the age of 100.

He was married twice: first to Eileen Newby, who died in 2001, and then to Lisa Birnie.

References

External links 
 
 

1913 births
2014 deaths
Canadian centenarians
Czech centenarians
Men centenarians
Czech Jews
Jews who emigrated to escape Nazism
Artists from Vancouver
Charles University alumni
Czechoslovak emigrants to Canada